Botswana competed at the 1996 Summer Olympics in Atlanta, United States.

Results by event

Athletics

Men

Track and road events

Boxing

See also
 Botswana at the 1994 Commonwealth Games
 Botswana at the 1998 Commonwealth Games

References
Official Olympic Reports
sports-reference

Nations at the 1996 Summer Olympics
1996
Olympics